Michael Ngaleku Shirima (born 1943) is a Tanzanian businessman, entrepreneur, and philanthropist. He is the founder and current chairman of Precision Air, Tanzania's largest privately owned airline.

Background
He was born in Usseri Rombo District, Kilimanjaro Region, Tanzania.

Career
Shirima started Precision Air in 1993, with a twin-engine five-seater airplane, a Piper Aztec. Using Arusha as its base, the airline began by providing charter flights to tourists visiting Serengeti National Park, Ngorongoro Crater, the island of Unguja, and other tourist attractions in Tanzania. As customer numbers grew, the airline acquired more equipment and began scheduled flights maintaining Arusha as its base. In 2003, Kenya Airways, the largest airline in East Africa, acquired 49% shareholding in Precision Air for a cash sum of US$2 million.

Precision Air is headquartered in Dar es Salaam, the largest city in Tanzania. In October 2011, Precision Air floated 30.35 percent shareholding in the airline stock, in an initial public offering on the Dar es Salaam Stock Exchange. , Kenyan press reports indicated that Michael Shirima is the largest shareholder in the stock of the airline with 42.91 percent shareholding.

Other responsibilities
In addition to his aviation interests, Shirima owns five percent of the stock of I&M Bank (Tanzania), a medium-sized commercial bank. As of December 2011, the bank's total assets were valued at about US$130 million (TZS:200 billion) and the bank's shareholders' equity had approximately US$15 million (TZS:23 billion). He also sits on the board of directors of the same bank.

He is the founder and proprietor of Cornelius Ngaleku Orphanage, located in Useri Division, Rombo District, Kilimanjaro Region, in northern Tanzania. The orphanage looks after homeless children picked up on the streets of Tanzanian cities. Shirima also serves as the Chairman of Tanzania Golf Union (TGU).

See also
 Kenya Airways
 I&M Bank

References

External links
 Website of Precision Air
 Website of I&M Bank (Tanzania)
 Website of Cornel Ngaleku Children Centre

Living people
Tanzanian businesspeople
Arusha Region
1943 births
People from Kilimanjaro Region